Nebrarctia wiltshirei is a moth of the family Erebidae. It was described by Hervé de Toulgoët in 1962. It is found in Kashmir.

References

 

Spilosomina
Moths described in 1962